Walter Chidhakwa is the former Minister of Mines and Mining Development of Zimbabwe. He is the Member of House of Assembly for Zvimba South (ZANU-PF). He was arrested on 21 December 2017 and charged with criminal abuse of office regarding the Mining Ministry parastatal Minerals Marketing Corporation of Zimbabwe.

References

Living people
Members of the National Assembly of Zimbabwe
ZANU–PF politicians
Year of birth missing (living people)
Government ministers of Zimbabwe
21st-century Zimbabwean politicians
Prisoners and detainees of Zimbabwe